The 2019 Men's Premier Hockey League was the 4th edition of the Premier Hockey League, the annual tournament men's field hockey championship of South Africa.

Competition format

Format
The 2019 Premier Hockey League followed a single round-robin format, followed by a classification round.

During the pool stage teams played each other once. The top four ranked teams qualified for the Classification Round. Team 1 played Team 4, while Team 2 played Team 3 in the two semi-finals. The two victorious teams moved onto the Final, while the losing teams competed for third place.

Point allocation
Match points were be distributed as follows:

 4 points: win by 3+ goals
 3 points: win and shoot-out win
 1 point: shoot-out loss
 0 points: loss

Participating teams
Each squad consists of 20 players, made up of 7 marquee players as determined by SA Hockey’s team, with a further 3 players into their 20 from the “new generation” pool featuring the country’s most exciting young talent. Coaches were forced to release between 4 and 8 players from the 2018 squads ahead of the draft.

Head Coach: Cheslyn Gie

Head Coach: Siphesihle Ntuli

Head Coach:Neville Rothman

Head Coach:  Ashlin Freddy

Head Coach: Mark Sanders

Head Coach: Lungile Tsolekile

Results

Pool stage

Matches

Classification stage

Semi-finals

Third place game

Final

Awards

Final ranking

Goalscorers

References

External links
2019 PHL Men at South African Hockey Association

Premier Hockey League (South Africa)
Premier Hockey League (South Africa)